Dilton may refer to:

Dilton Doiley, a character in Archie Comics
Dilton Marsh, a village in Wiltshire
Dilton Marsh railway station